The Japanese anime television series Soul Eater is directed by Takuya Igarashi, and produced by Bones, Aniplex, Dentsu, Media Factory, and TV Tokyo. Bones and Aniplex were responsible for the animation and music production respectively as well. The anime is based on the original Soul Eater manga series by Atsushi Ohkubo. The plot of the episodes follows Maka Albarn, a "meister" of the Death Weapon Meister Academy (DWMA), and her living weapon, Soul Eater, as she seeks to make the latter into a "death scythe" through absorbing the souls of evil humans. After episode 35, the series began deviating from the manga it was based on, which ultimately lead to the creation of an anime original ending.

The anime aired 51 episodes between April 7, 2008 and March 30, 2009 on TV Tokyo. The episodes also aired at later dates on TV Aichi, TV Hokkaido, TV Osaka, TV Setouchi, and TVQ Kyushu Broadcasting. It was released on DVD in thirteen separate compilations from August 22, 2008 to August 25, 2009. The anime was licensed by Funimation and was released in four half-season DVD box sets from February 9 to July 27, 2010. There are also two Blu-ray box sets that were released in Japan, containing both Japanese and English audio tracks; the first was released on January 26, 2011, and the second was released on March 23, 2011. Reruns aired on TV Tokyo under the title Soul Eater: Repeat Show from September 30, 2010 to March 31, 2011. The English dub of the series aired on Adult Swim's Toonami programming block starting on February 17, 2013.

Six pieces of theme music were used for the original broadcasting; two opening themes and four closing themes. The opening theme for the first 30 episodes is "Resonance" by T.M.Revolution. The second opening theme from episode 31 onwards is "Papermoon" by Tommy Heavenly6. Soul Eater: Repeat Show features two additional opening and closing themes.


Episode list

Home media release

Japanese

English

See also

List of Soul Eater characters
List of Soul Eater chapters

References

External links
Official website 
Official TV Tokyo website  

Soul Eater
Episodes